Social behaviors present themselves in a variety of ways. Especially in those in the education system. Social behavior is behavior that occurs among two or more organisms, typically from the same species. Those in the K-12 system are in the process of developing behaviors that will generate future personality traits and behavioral patterns. Peers often have tremendous impacts on an individuals behavior and way of thinking.

Different social patterns in children (K-5)

There are 6 types of Social Patterns used by children:
Unoccupied behavior: The child is not involved in any particular activity (often seen day dreaming).
Onlooker behavior: This behavior involves watching other children play (watches the activity but does not participate).
Solitary play: This type of play involves a child playing alone (Independent).
Parallel play: This type of play involves a child playing beside other children (plays near the other children but not with them).
Associative play: This type of play involves a child playing with other children (each child does what he/or she wants within the group).
Cooperative play: This type of play involves organization (play as a group).

Factors influencing behavior

Social learning theory

Albert Bandura is a psychologist who proposed Social Learning Theory, argues two decisive points in regards to learning theories. The first, mediating processes occur between stimuli & responses. Secondly, behavior is learned from the environment through the process of observational learning.

In and out of the classroom children learn through a four step pattern Bandura formulated through a cognitive and operant view.

Attention: something is noticed within the environment and the individual is attentive to it.
Retention: the behavior is noted and remembered.
Reproduction: the individual copies or emulates the behavior that is observed.
Motivation: the environment provides a consequence that changes the chances the behavior is repeated through her positive or negative praise or punishment.

References

Sociology of education